Bembidioglyphus is a genus of mites in the family Acaridae.

Species
 Bembidioglyphus acinacisetosus Klimov, 1998

References

Acaridae